Zaghan, also rendered as Zakhan or Jakhan, may refer to:
 Zaghan-e Olya
 Zaghan-e Sofla